Cuchara is an unincorporated community in Huerfano County, Colorado, United States. It is located near a former ski resort in the mountains south of the town of La Veta.  Its altitude is 8,468 feet (2,581 m).  State Highway 12 travels through Cuchara as it approaches Trinidad to the southeast.

Description
Cuchara is situated on the eastern slopes of the Sangre de Cristo Mountains in south-central Colorado. It is west of the Spanish Peaks.  Cucharas Pass, at almost 10,000 feet, is a few miles south of the town of Cuchara. The Cucharas River flows on the outskirts of town. The San Isabel National Forest surrounds the town.

In Spanish, "cuchara" means "spoon," reflecting the area's valley being so shaped. A large number of locations are listed as having the name of "Cuchara" or some derivation there of in Huerfano County, including Cuchara Junction northeast of Walsenburg and the Cuchara Formation.

This small town has a few small businesses such as restaurants and small hotels or lodges. This is a midpoint for stopping along the scenic State Highway 12.

History
In the summer of 2018, Cuchara was evacuated due to a wildfire that threatened the town in the middle of their peak season. The evacuation caused local businesses to suffer financially.

References

External links

Unincorporated communities in Huerfano County, Colorado
Unincorporated communities in Colorado